Beautiful Disorder is the second and final album by hard rock band Breaking Point, released in 2005. The tracks "Show Me a Sign" and "All Messed Up" were released as singles. It was recorded with producer Ben Schigel playing drums.  The band's second drummer, Aaron "Zeke" Dauner was then added, who replaced Jody Abbott. David Cowell was also added on guitar to tour from this point.
The song "Goodbye to You" is featured on the Fantastic Four movie soundtrack.

Track listing 
All songs written by Justin Rimer and Ben Schigel. 
 Show Me a Sign - 3:03
 Don't Let Go - 4:02
 All Messed Up - 3:12
 Promise Keeper - 3:33
 Goodbye to You - 3:51
 How Does It Feel - 3:38
 Had Enough of You - 3:36
 Never Walk Away - 3:21
 Nothing Left at All - 3:29
 Reality Show - 3:18
 Killing with Kindness - 3:44

Personnel
 Brett Erickson - vocals
 Justin Rimer - guitar, backing vocals
 Greg Edmondson - bass, backing vocals
 Aaron "Zeke" Dauner - drums

References

2005 albums
Breaking Point (band) albums
Wind-up Records albums